Maysan Governorate is a governorate in southeastern Iraq, bordering Iran. Its administrative centre is the city of Amarah, and it is composed of six districts. Before 1976, it was named Amara Province.

Etymology
This region was called Messène by Ancient Greeks (Strabo), Mayšān (ܡܝܫܢ) in Syriac. Mēs̲h̲ān in Middle Persian and Parthian ( myšn), Mēs̲h̲un in Armenian, Maysān in Arabic, and T’iao-tche (Chaldaea) in the Han sources.
It's the Kurdish form of Parthian "mēθhan", Parsig "mēhan", and Persian "mihan/میهن", meaning "homeland".

History

Alexander the Great founded the town of Charax Spasinu in 324 B.C. in the governorate. The town later became the capital of the Characene kingdom. It now exists as the ruins of Naysan.

The area suffered greatly during the Iran–Iraq War, during which it was a major battlefield, and again after the 1991 Iraqi uprising.

Government

Ba'athist era
From 1992 to 1994, Saddam Hussein appointed a senior military commander named Kamel Sajid, who had served during the Iran–Iraq War and led special forces missions into Kuwait, during the Gulf War, to become the governor, following a decision to replace all provincial governors with military ones. Under Janabi's administration he reportedly introduced stronger Islamic policies, which coincided with Saddam's faith campaign at the time.

Saddam Hussein's brother-in-law who visited the province commented on Janabi's administration, saying he had built a "mini Islamic state". Janabi  ordered the closure of all bars serving alcohol, and built several mosques across the province. He would also collect money for donations to the sick and poor, as well as visit hospitals. Janabi also reprimanded a police officer for allowing his car to cut through traffic, after the officer noticed it was the governor's car. Locals reportedly referred to him as "Abu Omar" in reference to Umayyad Caliph Umar II, viewing Janabi's rule as similar. He also reportedly spared the life of a Shia man who was cooperating with Iran in the province and had turned himself in to Iraqi security forces.

In 1994, Janabi was relieved from his position and sent to work for Saddam in Baghdad instead. Many Ba'athist officials criticized both Saddam and Janabi for their religiousness, and told Saddam that Janabi was a fifth-column element in the regime. However, Saddam dismissed these claims in his favor, and Janabi himself was reportedly loyal to Saddam.

Post-2003
The current governor is Ali Dawai Lazem, a supporter of Muqtada al-Sadr. As of 2013, he is the only provincial governor in Iraq belonging to the Sadrist Movement. Though he is a Shi'a, he is a non-sectarian and has said "It doesn't make a difference if you are Sunni or Shi'ite or Christian. I don't differentiate between anyone." He has been called Iraq's most popular politician.

In 2013, The New York Times praised Dawai's governance, stating that "roads are being paved, new sewage systems installed and residents now enjoy electricity for up to 22 hours a day, far more than in Baghdad."

List of governors

Demographics
Maysan has a Shia Arab  majority and a small population of Mandeaens and Christians. It is covered in the south by many Mesopotamian Marshes, and has traditionally been home to many Marsh Arabs.

In 2007, the unemployment rate was 17%.

Districts
 Ali Al-Gharbi (علي الغربي)
 Amara (العمارة)
 Al-Kahla (الكحلاء)
 Al-Maimouna (الميمونة)
 Al-Mejar Al-Kabi (المجر الكبير)
 Qal'at Saleh (قلعة صالح)

References

External links
Iraq Inter-Agency Information & Analysis Unit Reports, Maps and Assessments of Iraq's Governorates from the UN Inter-Agency Information & Analysis Unit

 
Governorates of Iraq
1976 establishments in Iraq
States and territories established in 1975